Ancistrocerus oviventris is a Palearctic species of potter wasp.

References

External links
Images representing Ancistrocerus oviventris

Hymenoptera of Europe
Potter wasps
Insects described in 1836